Marko Kloos is a German author of military science fiction and high fantasy. Born in Germany, Kloos lives and works in the United States.

Work
Kloos is best known for his Frontlines series of military science fiction novels. Featuring the protagonist Andrew Grayson, they are set in a future in which a Western and an Eastern power bloc are at war with each other and with an alien threat.

Reviewing the first novel, Terms of Enlistment, io9 described it as sticking close to the conventions of the genre, focusing on "guns, acronyms, hard-ass drill sergeants, explosions and battles on alien worlds". The reviewer considered the second novel, Lines of Departure, to be an improvement in that it reflected a critical outlook towards powerful, centralized government that was often absent in leading works of the genre such as Robert Heinlein's Starship Troopers.

Lines of Departure was nominated for the 2015 Hugo Award for Best Novel on a slate organized by the "Sad Puppies", a group of "right-leaning science fiction writers." In reaction to this, Kloos withdrew the novel from consideration for the award. He was subsequently honored by George R. R. Martin for this decision.

In 2019, his short stories, Lucky Thirteen and On The Use Of Shape-Shifters In Warfare, were adapted as part of the Netflix anthology series Love, Death & Robots.

Aftershocks, the first book in a new series, "The Palladium Wars," was released in July 2019.

Personal life
Kloos served in the West German military as a junior NCO in 1989. He drew upon these experiences in his military science fiction.

Kloos lives in New Hampshire with his family and has been employed as "a soldier, a bookseller, a freight dock worker, a tech support drone, and a corporate IT administrator". He is a graduate of the Viable Paradise writers' workshop.

Bibliography

Frontlines series
Novels
Terms of Enlistment (2013), 47North
Lines of Departure (2014), 47North
Angles of Attack (2015), 47North
Chains of Command (2016), 47North
Fields of Fire (2017), 47North
Points of Impact (2018), 47North
Orders of Battle (2020), 47North
Centers of Gravity (2022),  47North
Chapbooks
Lucky Thirteen (2013)
Measures of Absolution (2013)
Comics
With Ivan Brandon:
Frontlines: Requiem (four issues, Jet City Comics, 2016)

The Palladium Wars series 
Novels

 Aftershocks (July 1, 2019), 47North
 Ballistic (May 26, 2020), 47North
 Citadel (August 10, 2021), 47North

Other work
Short fiction
Ink and Blood (2011)
Cake Whores of Mars (2012) 
Berlin Is Never Berlin (2020)

References

External links

Military science fiction writers
American science fiction writers
German science fiction writers
Writers from New Hampshire
Living people
Year of birth missing (living people)
American male novelists